Bettina Catherine Welch (1922 – 5 March 1993) was a New Zealand-born Australia-based actress, primarily in radio and theatre and of the latter in television roles. She was best known for her role in television soap opera Number 96 as Maggie Cameron, a scheming businesswoman and fashion editor.

The series creator and writer David Sale, stated she was the first major bitch on television, long before Alexis Carrington (Joan Collins)

Early life and training

Welch was born Auckland, New Zealand. Welch started her acting career aged 18 in 1940 when she arrived in Sydney from New Zealand with her parents on holiday. In Sydney she won a competition that led to her being trained by J. C. Williamson's theatre company, and she also began acting on Australian radio. Her training with J. C. Williamson led to a succession of theatre roles with the company.  She married Dermot Patrick O'Brien on 20 February 1945 at St Clanice's Catholic Church, Rushcutters Bay, New South Wales.

Theatre career

When British actor Robert Morley conducted an Australian theatre tour in 1949 she played his young mistress in his co-scripted play Edward, My Son.  
 
Her other stage roles include Australian productions of Harvey with Joe E. Brown, Simon and Laura and The Deep Blue Sea with Googie Withers and John McCallum, the lead role opposite Emrys Jones in Double Image, and a featured role with Sir Robert Helpmann in Nude with Violin by Noël Coward.  
 
Welch appeared as the enchantress Morgan le Fey in J. C. Williamson's production of Camelot in the early 1960s, a role she played for two and a half years. She subsequently took one of the lead roles in four-handed comedy Any Wednesday, appeared in productions of There's A Girl In My Soup, and The Band Wagon. The nurse in Loot, by Joe Orton featured in A Delicate Balance, playing Julia by Edward Albee and took the lead role in a production of Frederick Knott's Wait Until Dark, a role for which she was critically acclaimed.  
 
Welch played in Melbourne and Sydney in Hal Porter's Australian play Eden House. She had a major role in the Sydney Theatre Company's season of the Stephen Sondheim musical, A Little Night Music" at the Sydney Opera House in 1990.

Television roles

Through the 1960s she also had guest roles in Australian television drama series. In the late 1960s she appeared in the Crawford Productions adventure series Hunter (1967), and played various guest roles in the top-rated Crawford Productions police dramas Homicide and Division 4.

In 1971 Welch appeared in an episode of popular situation comedy series The Group. After that show's writer David Sale, who had earlier been impressed by the performance she gave in the Australian Broadcasting Corporation-Artransa Films science fiction children's series Phoenix 5 (1970), saw her in the relatively minor role in The Group, he promised to write something especially for her next time. When he created Number 96 he kept his word, creating the role of corrupt businesswoman and fashion editor Maggie Cameron for her.

Number 96

Appearing in Number 96 from its inception in March 1972, Welch's character Maggie emerged as a popular bitch-figure in the top-rated serial.

Welch says she partly based her characterisation of Maggie on the Mrs Robinson character played by Anne Bancroft in feature film The Graduate.

In 1973 Welch left Number 96 temporarily to again act on stage opposite Robert Morley, this time in How the Other Half Loves. She returned to the series after that, and also reprised the role in the feature film version of Number 96 released in 1974.

In 1975 Number 96 suffered a drop in ratings so a bomb storyline was developed as a dramatic way to write out several characters. The story went to air in September, and Maggie was revealed to have been the person who planted the bomb and her character written out the series by being sent to prison. Welch returned for a guest appearance in 1976 when Maggie's trial was shown, and she appeared in the show's final episode in 1977 where it was explained that Maggie had been released from prison.

Other television roles

After Number 96 Welch continued to make guest appearances in Australian television series, including roles in Glenview High (1977), The Outsiders (1977), Young Ramsay (1978), and in legal drama Case for the Defence (1978). Through the 1980s Welch played small featured roles in several Australian television movies and feature films, including Undercover (1983), and guest starred in two episodes of A Country Practice. She died in 1993 in Australia, aged 71.

Filmography 

FILM

TELEVISION

References

External links
 

1922 births
1993 deaths
Australian stage actresses
Australian television actresses
20th-century Australian actresses
New Zealand emigrants to Australia